WERN (88.7 FM) is a radio station licensed to Madison, Wisconsin. The station is part of Wisconsin Public Radio (WPR), and is the flagship of WPR's "NPR News and Classical Network", consisting of classical music and news and talk programming.

The station first signed on in 1947, as the first FM station in what would become Wisconsin Public Radio. It was originally known as WHA-FM, after its AM sister, WHA; it became WERN in 1974.

Since Ideas Network flagship WHA must reduce its power to an all-but-unlistenable level at night, WERN airs a simulcast of the Ideas Network on its HD3 channel.  This is used to feed a low-powered translator at 90.9 FM for non-HD Radio listeners. WERN's position on the low end of the FM dial, relatively high transmitter location and power allow for a large coverage area which affords WPR's News/Classical network a strong signal across Southern Wisconsin and Northern Illinois including well into the Rockford area and Metro Milwaukee.

See also
 Wisconsin Public Radio

References

External links
Wisconsin Public Radio

ERN
Wisconsin Public Radio
Classical music radio stations in the United States
NPR member stations